Mayo East was a parliamentary constituency represented in Dáil Éireann, the lower house of the Irish parliament or Oireachtas from 1969 to 1997. The constituency was served by 3 deputies (Teachtaí Dála, commonly known as TDs). The method of election was proportional representation by means of the single transferable vote (PR-STV).

History and boundaries 
The constituency was created under the terms of the Electoral (Amendment) Act 1969, taking in parts of the former Mayo North and Mayo South constituencies. It was abolished for the 1997 general election when it was combined with Mayo West to form the new 5 seat Mayo constituency.

TDs

Elections

1992 general election

1989 general election

1987 general election

November 1982 general election

February 1982 general election 

† The Irish Times does not give Higgins' total in the third count.

1981 general election

1977 general election

1973 general election

1969 general election

See also 
Dáil constituencies
Politics of the Republic of Ireland
Historic Dáil constituencies
Elections in the Republic of Ireland

References

External links 
Oireachtas Members Database

Historic constituencies in County Mayo
Dáil constituencies in the Republic of Ireland (historic)
1969 establishments in Ireland
1977 disestablishments in Ireland
Constituencies established in 1969
Constituencies disestablished in 1977